Crossacres can refer to:

 Crossacres Metrolink station
 Crossacres, Woolton